Francisco Chacón Gutiérrez (born May 8, 1976, Irapuato, Guanajuato) is a Mexican former football referee qualified by FIFA to officiate international matches.

An international referee from 2009 to 2017, Chacón has been selected for two FIFA Tournaments, the 2011 CONCACAF Gold Cup and the 2011 Copa América.

Officiating in domestic leagues
Chacón's first game as a referee was on September 7, 2003, in the Mexican Primera "A" during Round 6 of Torneo Apertura 2003 between Tapatio and Tijuana. On August 21, 2004, he made his debut in the Mexican Primera Division in a match between Club Atlas and Puebla FC in Round 2 of Torneo Apertura 2004. He issued seven cards, including two red cards, during the match. He refereeing in 2 Superclasicos and 1 as the 4th official in Mexican football short tournaments history. On August 20, 2011, Chacón was the official for the match between Santos Laguna and Monarcas Morelia when the match was suspended in the 40th minute due to gunfire.

FIFA accreditation
Chacón was accredited to official international matches by FIFA on January 1, 2009.

International matches officiated

References

External links
 http://www.femexfut.org.mx/
 FIFA.com
 http://www.record.com.mx/article/francisco-chacon-suspendido-tres-partidos

1976 births
Living people
Mexican football referees
Copa América referees
People from Morelia
Sportspeople from Michoacán
CONCACAF Gold Cup referees
CONCACAF Champions League referees